Aymen Harzi (born 1 March 1995) is a Tunisian football midfielder who currently plays for CS Sfaxien.

References

1995 births
Living people
Tunisian footballers
JS Kairouan players
CS Sfaxien players
Association football midfielders
Tunisian Ligue Professionnelle 1 players